Dennis William Rampling (25 November 1923 – 14 September 2015) was an English professional footballer who played as an outside right in the Football League for Fulham, Bournemouth & Boscombe Athletic and Brentford.

Playing career 
An outside right, Rampling began his career with Fulham during the Second World War and signed in November 1942. He made just four appearances and scored one goal for the club before signing for Third Division South high-flyers Bournemouth & Boscombe Athletic in July 1948. He made 24 league appearances and scored four goals during his single season at Dean Court and joined Second Division club Brentford in May 1949. He made his debut on the opening day of the 1949–50 season against Tottenham Hotspur, but failed to make another appearance for the club before departing in April 1950. After his release from Brentford, Rampling dropped into non-League football and had spells with Weymouth and Ashford Town.

Personal life 
Rampling was called into the RAF in 1946 and served as a PT instructor.

Career statistics

References

1923 births
2015 deaths
People from Gainsborough, Lincolnshire
English footballers
Brentford F.C. players
English Football League players
Fulham F.C. players
Worcester City F.C. players
Southern Football League players
Weymouth F.C. players
Association football outside forwards
Ashford United F.C. players
AFC Bournemouth players
Association football midfielders
Royal Air Force Physical Training instructors
20th-century Royal Air Force personnel